Rômulo Marques Macedo, shortly Rômulo (born April 3, 1980) is a Brazilian footballer who plays as a forward.

His previous clubs include K-League sides Jeju United & Busan I'Park, Chinese Super League side Henan Construction, Primeiro de Agosto & Petro Atlético in Angola, Clube do Remo, Criciúma, Rio Branco, Flamengo and Vasco da Gama.

Club career 
2001 Rio Branco AC
2001–2002 Criciúma EC
2002 Clube do Remo
2003 Criciúma EC
2004 Clube do Remo
2005 Petro Atlético
2006 Primeiro de Agosto
2007 Petro Atlético
2008 Jeju United
2009–2010 Busan I'Park
2011 Henan Construction

Honors
 Campeonato Paraense in 2004 with Clube do Remo
 Girabola champion in 2006 with Primeiro de Agosto
 Angolan Cup winner in 2006 with Primeiro de Agosto

References

제주, 브라질 출신 미드필더 호물루 영입 at K-League homepage

External links
 

1980 births
Living people
Association football midfielders
Brazilian footballers
Brazilian expatriate footballers
Rio Branco Football Club players
Criciúma Esporte Clube players
Clube do Remo players
Jeju United FC players
Busan IPark players
Henan Songshan Longmen F.C. players
Chinese Super League players
K League 1 players
Expatriate footballers in Angola
Expatriate footballers in South Korea
Expatriate footballers in China
Sportspeople from Rio de Janeiro (state)
Brazilian expatriate sportspeople in South Korea
Brazilian expatriate sportspeople in Angola
Brazilian expatriate sportspeople in China
Atlético Petróleos de Luanda players
C.D. Primeiro de Agosto players